Chhagan Singh won 2018 Rajasthan Legislative Assembly election with margin of 31,048 votes from Ahore constituency of the Rajasthan Legislative Assembly in the Jalore district.

References

Rajasthani politicians
Rajasthan MLAs 2018–2023
Living people
Year of birth missing (living people)